Kristineberg is a locality situated in Lycksele Municipality, Västerbotten County, Sweden with 257 inhabitants in 2010.

Near Kristineberg is Kristinebergsgruvan, a former open pit copper mine exploited by the predecessor of the present Boliden AB. The ore was transported via a 96 km long ropeway conveyor to Boliden and from there via railway to the port of Skellefteå. The ropeway has been closed in 1987 except for 13 km used by the Norsjö aerial tramway as a tourist attraction.

References 

Populated places in Västerbotten County
Populated places in Lycksele Municipality